Vavuniya Tamil Madhya Maha Vidyalayam also Known as VTMMV ( Vavuṉiyā Tamiḻ Mattiya Maha Vidhyālayam) is a national school in Vavuniya, Sri Lanka.

History 
V/Vavuniya Tamil Madhya Maha Vidyalayam was started in 1929 during the British rule but it was officially started in 1931 with 25 students and two teachers. Mr.C. Muthiah was the Principal of this school which was first established on Mannar Road. During the 2nd World War, when this school building was consecrated for the medical needs of the wounded soldiers, this school was functioning for some time in a part of the house of Mr.K.D. Gunarathanam in Vairavarpuliyankulam. In 1948, after the independence of the country and the veterans left, the school was shifted to the building on Mannar Road. During this period, students who received primary education in rural villages came to this school for secondary education and obtained permission, so the number of students increased to 160 and the school was upgraded to a Secondary school. Mr.N.Nadarasa officiated as the Principal of the School along with nine teachers who rendered their services.During this period, the school flourished due to the dedicated service of Mr.ES Navaratnam, Mr.S.Padmanathan, Withuvan Po.Kandasamipillai, Mr.S.Arunachalam, Mrs.N.Milvaganam, Mrs.S.Thangarasu, Mrs.C.Gunarathanam.

Mr. S.J. Soundaranayagam took charge as the in-charge sports department. During his time, not only in the school sports department, but also in the fields like Music and Dance, participation in school level, district level and provincial level competitions had progressed to the extent of participation. Due to the number of students, only three houses namely Bharthi, Ilango and Pugazhendi were established among the students to conduct sports competitions.Due to the lack of land for the operation of the school, the Sports competitions were held at the Vavuniya Municipal Council ground.

In 1952, Scouts Movement was started in this school under the leadership of Mr.V.Emanuel as teacher. In 1955, Mr. Ganesan became the principal of this school. In order to solve the lack of physical resources of the school during his time, he sought Member of Parliament Honorable C. Sundharalingam with the cooperation of the Parents & Teacher Association.

As a result, 40 acres of land on Kandy Road was allotted to the school. In 1958, the school was shifted to the land on Kandy Road. The former school is still functioning as a Sinhala language school under the name Gamini Vidyalayam. In 1958, the principal of this school was Mr. J. G. Samuel.15 teachers served with him. After him Mr.S.Irasanayakam (1962 – 1967) and Mr. S.Ariyaratnam (1967 – 1971) worked as principals of this school. Poet Mr. S. Chinnathambi composed the school anthem of this school and Music teacher Pon Nadarasa composed the music for the school anthem.

In the year 1962, GCE A/L Arts Tream was started for the first time in this school which was gradually developing in the subject and co-curricular fields. The students educated in art department were selected for the university. Apputhurai Jayaseeli was the first student from this school to be selected for the university in the arts. Following this, in 1972, during the period when Mr. P.Sivagurunathan (1972-1976) was the principal, commerce and science streams were also started in GCE A/L. Muthulingam Arulranchitham was the first student to get university admission in Science. Following them, more students in mathematics and commerce streams got university admissions.

Mr. M. Lokasingham served as the principal of the school from 1976 to 1978 and Mr. P. Sivagnanam from 1978 to 1987. They were followed by Mr. S. Kandiah and Mr. Su. Sivapalan as vice-principals. He took charge as the principal of the school till 1993. The quality of the school gradually improved due to the services of these capable principals. The school was upgraded to a national school during the period when Mr. S.Sivakumaran was the principal from 1993-1998. In the year 1996, due to the displacement of the Jaffna people in the country, there was a huge increase in the number of students and the school had to run twice. As a result, the school was running in 2 sections, morning and evening, and was providing education to all the students who applied for it. 

Following Mr.S.Sivakumaran as the principal, Mrs.Chidambaranathan took over the responsibility of the school principal during the period 1998 – 2000, Mr.I.Irasarathanam during the period 2000 – 2004 and Mr.C.Ulaganathan during the period 2004 – 2010. During the period of Principal Mr. C. Ulaganathan, the school was held partially in various buildings of the city which were handed over as a shelter for the displaced people. Mr. C.Ulaganathan's work in keeping the school orderly during that time was great. Following them, Mr. M. S. Padmanathan became the principal of the school in 2011. During his tenure, the school became the 1AB standard school with the highest student strength and capabilities in Northern Province with more than 3000 students and more than 160 teachers and five houses namely Bharti Ilango, Valluvar Pugazendi and Kambar. In 2012,  technological stream for GCE A/L. was also set up and it shines as a school that includes all Streams. 

After the retirement of the principal Mr. M. S. Padmanathan, the principal Mr. C. Marianayagam, who took over the responsibility, saw development in terms of school physical resources. In 2016, Mr. Tha. Amirthalingam, the principal, has taken charge of the school, which has been developing in this way. With his dedicated and experienced service, Vavuniya Tamil Madhya Maha Vidyalayam has created many achievements at the national level in co-curricular activities. Mr. Ananthan Lokeswaran from Sri Lanka Educational Administrative Service General Staff took over as the Principal on 05.03.2020 after the retirement of Principal Mr. Tha. Amirthalingam.

Location 
The school is located in the center of Vavuniya near the A9 road. The school is surrounded by the Vavuniya South Zone Education Office and the Irrigation Department.

Administration 
The School is funded by the Ministry of Education, which appoints its principal. The principal is the head of the administration of the School and is assisted by a Deputy Principal. The school is divided into three sections: the Primary school & Secondary School each coming under a deputy principal (the head of the primary school is known as the headmaster/headmistress). The School educates close to 8,200 students in both secondary and primary education.

The senior prefects of the school also hold comparatively an important role in the school. Since they have completed their final examinations, they are senior to any other student of the college. Hence their disciplinary powers extend to all students of Royal College.

Since its establishment, the main medium of education had been Tamil. In 2008 English was introduced as a medium of education at the School. Students may select one of the Two languages in which to conduct their studies.

School Anthem

Sports 
This school is considered to be the biggest school in Vavuniya and Northern Region. The school has won many medals in provincial and national level competitions due to its large number of students. The school sports competition is held in the month of January or February every year. There are 5 houses in the school. These houses are classified by the final digit of the admission number.

 List of schools in Northern Province, Sri Lanka

References

External links
 Vavuniya Tamil Madhya Maha Vidyalayam

National schools in Sri Lanka
Schools in Vavuniya